University Hospital Ayr is a general hospital on the outskirts of Ayr, Scotland. It covers a catchment area of approximately 100,000 people in South Ayrshire and is managed by NHS Ayrshire and Arran.

History 
The hospital, which replaced the Ayr County Hospital, Heathfield Hospital and Seafield Children's Hospital, was built on part of the site of Ailsa Hospital and opened as the Ayr Hospital by then-Prime Minister John Major in 1991.

In March 2012 it became University Hospital Ayr as a result of the partnership with the University of the West of Scotland.

The accident and emergency department had been due to close with services being transferred to Crosshouse Hospital in Kilmarnock. However, the incoming SNP government cancelled the planned closure in June 2007.

Services
The hospital has 333 beds and provides a number of services including ophthalmology and audiology.

References

External links
 

Hospital buildings completed in 1991
NHS Ayrshire and Arran
Hospitals in South Ayrshire
NHS Scotland hospitals
1991 establishments in Scotland
Hospitals established in 1991
Buildings and structures in Ayr